These are the Billboard magazine number-one albums for each week in 1950.

Chart history through July 15

Chart history July 22 to end of year

See also
1950 in music
List of number-one albums (United States)

Notes

References

1950
United States Billboard Albums